Sergi Cardona Bermúdez (born 8 July 1999) is a Spanish footballer who plays for UD Las Palmas as a left back.

Club career
Born in Lloret de Mar, Girona, Catalonia, Cardona represented Gimnàstic de Tarragona as a youth, and was promoted to the farm team on 6 July 2018. He made his senior debut on 11 September, starting in a 0–0 away draw against UE Castelldefels.

Cardona scored his first senior goal on 27 October 2018, netting the opener in a 2–0 home defeat of UA Horta. He made his professional debut the following 9 June, coming on as a second-half substitute for Pol Prats in a 1–1 home draw against CD Lugo in the Segunda División.

On 25 June 2020, Cardona left Nàstic after not accepting the offer of renewal from the club, and moved to UD Las Palmas in September, being initially assigned to the reserves in the Segunda División B. He made his first-team debut for the latter on 30 May 2021, starting in a 1–0 away win over UD Logroñés.

References

External links

1999 births
Living people
People from Selva
Sportspeople from the Province of Girona
Spanish footballers
Footballers from Catalonia
Association football defenders
Segunda División players
Segunda División B players
Tercera División players
CF Pobla de Mafumet footballers
Gimnàstic de Tarragona footballers
UD Las Palmas Atlético players
UD Las Palmas players